Manaaki Selby-Rickit is a New Zealand rugby union player who plays for the Southland in the Mitre 10 Cup competition.

He is the son of former All Black, Hud Rickit.

Assault conviction 
Selby-Rickit was convicted of assault after an altercation with an intoxicated person on a night out.

References

External links
 Southland Rugby profile

New Zealand rugby union players
Rugby union locks
Living people
Southland rugby union players
People from Ōtaki, New Zealand
1996 births
Highlanders (rugby union) players
Bay of Plenty rugby union players
Māori All Blacks players
Rugby union players from the Wellington Region
Manaaki
Chiefs (rugby union) players